Văcarea may refer to several villages in Romania:

 Văcarea, a village in Mihăeşti Commune, Argeș County
 Văcarea, a village in Dăneşti Commune, Gorj County

and to a river in Romania:
 Văcarea River, a tributary of the Râul Târgului

See also 
 Văcărești (disambiguation)
 Văcăria River (disambiguation)
 Văcărescu family